Toby Hull is the son of Rod Hull, a popular entertainer who appeared with an arm-length puppet known as Emu.  He is one of three children from Hull's second marriage.

After the death of his father in 1999, Toby brought Emu out of retirement for the 2003 pantomime season, appearing in Cinderella at the Theatre Royal, Windsor. In 2007 Toby appeared with a refurbished Emu in their own series on CITV.

References

Further reading
  
  
  
  
  

Living people
Year of birth missing (living people)